The following outline is provided as an overview of and topical guide to Slovenia:

Slovenia – sovereign country located in southern Central Europe bordering Italy to the west, the Adriatic Sea to the southwest, Croatia to the south and east, Hungary to the northeast, and Austria to the north.  The capital of Slovenia is Ljubljana. At various points in Slovenia's history, the country has been part of the Roman Empire, the Byzantine Empire, the Republic of Venice, the Duchy of Carantania (only modern Slovenia's northern part), the Holy Roman Empire, the Habsburg monarchy, the Austrian Empire (later known as Austria-Hungary), the State of Slovenes, Croats and Serbs, the Kingdom of Serbs, Croats and Slovenes (renamed to Kingdom of Yugoslavia in 1929) between the two World Wars, and the Socialist Federal Republic of Yugoslavia from 1945 until gaining independence in 1991. Slovenia is the only former communist state to be at the same time a member of the European Union, the Eurozone, the Schengen area, the Organization for Security and Co-operation in Europe, the Council of Europe and NATO.

General reference 

 Common English country name:  Slovenia
 Pronunciation: 
 Official English country name:  The Republic of Slovenia
 Common endonym: Slovenija
 Official endonym: 
 Adjectives: Slovene, Slovenian
 Demonym(s): Slovene, Slovenian
 Etymology: Name of Slovenia
 International rankings of Slovenia
 ISO country codes:  SI, SVN, 705
 ISO region codes:  See ISO 3166-2:SI
 Internet country code top-level domain: .si

Geography of Slovenia 

Geography of Slovenia
 Slovenia is: a country
 Location:
 Northern Hemisphere and Eastern Hemisphere
 Eurasia
 Europe
 Central Europe
 Southern Europe
 Time zone:  Central European Time (UTC+01), Central European Summer Time (UTC+02)
 Extreme points of Slovenia
 High:  Triglav 
 Low:  Adriatic Sea 0 m
 Land boundaries:  1,086 km
 455 km
 330 km
 199 km
 102 km
 Coastline:  Adriatic Sea 46.6 km
 Population of Slovenia: 2,029,000 (July 15, 2008)  - 143rd most populous country

 Area of Slovenia: 20,271 km2
 Atlas of Slovenia

Environment of Slovenia 

 Climate of Slovenia
 Renewable energy in Slovenia
 Geology of Slovenia
 Protected areas of Slovenia
 Biosphere reserves in Slovenia
 National parks of Slovenia
 Wildlife of Slovenia
 Fauna of Slovenia
 Birds of Slovenia
 Mammals of Slovenia

Natural geographic features of Slovenia 

 Glaciers of Slovenia
 Islands of Slovenia
 Lakes of Slovenia
 Mountains of Slovenia
 Rivers of Slovenia
 Waterfalls of Slovenia
 Valleys of Slovenia
 World Heritage Sites in Slovenia

Regions of Slovenia 

Statistical regions of Slovenia

Ecoregions of Slovenia 

List of ecoregions in Slovenia
 Ecoregions in Slovenia

Administrative divisions of Slovenia 

Administrative divisions of Slovenia
 Capital of Slovenia: Ljubljana
 List of cities in Slovenia

Demography of Slovenia 

Demographics of Slovenia

Politics of Slovenia 

Politics of Slovenia
 Form of government: parliamentary representative democratic republic
 Capital of Slovenia: Ljubljana
 Elections in Slovenia

 Political parties in Slovenia

Branches of the government of Slovenia

Executive branch of the government of Slovenia 
 Head of state: President of Slovenia
 Head of government: Prime Minister of Slovenia
 Government of Slovenia

Legislative branch of the government of Slovenia 

 Parliament of Slovenia (incompletely bicameral)
 National Council
 National Assembly

Judicial branch of the government of Slovenia 

Judiciary of Slovenia
 Supreme Court of Slovenia

Foreign relations of Slovenia 

Foreign relations of Slovenia
 Diplomatic missions in Slovenia
 Diplomatic missions of Slovenia

International organization membership 
The Republic of Slovenia is a member of:

Australia Group
Bank for International Settlements (BIS)
Central European Initiative (CEI)
Confederation of European Paper Industries (CEPI)
Council of Europe (CE)
Economic and Monetary Union (EMU)
Euro-Atlantic Partnership Council (EAPC)
European Bank for Reconstruction and Development (EBRD)
European Investment Bank (EIB)
European Union (EU)
Food and Agriculture Organization (FAO)
Inter-American Development Bank (IADB)
International Atomic Energy Agency (IAEA)
International Bank for Reconstruction and Development (IBRD)
International Chamber of Commerce (ICC)
International Civil Aviation Organization (ICAO)
International Criminal Court (ICCt)
International Criminal Police Organization (Interpol)
International Development Association (IDA)
International Federation of Red Cross and Red Crescent Societies (IFRCS)
International Finance Corporation (IFC)
International Hydrographic Organization (IHO)
International Labour Organization (ILO)
International Maritime Organization (IMO)
International Monetary Fund (IMF)
International Olympic Committee (IOC)
International Organization for Migration (IOM)
International Organization for Standardization (ISO)
International Red Cross and Red Crescent Movement (ICRM)
International Telecommunication Union (ITU)

Inter-Parliamentary Union (IPU)
Multilateral Investment Guarantee Agency (MIGA)
Nonaligned Movement (NAM) (guest)
North Atlantic Treaty Organization (NATO)
Nuclear Suppliers Group (NSG)
Organisation internationale de la Francophonie (OIF) (observer)
Organisation for Economic Co-operation and Development (OECD)
Organization for Security and Cooperation in Europe (OSCE)
Organisation for the Prohibition of Chemical Weapons (OPCW)
Organization of American States (OAS) (observer)
Permanent Court of Arbitration (PCA)
Schengen Convention
Southeast European Cooperative Initiative (SECI)
United Nations (UN)
United Nations Conference on Trade and Development (UNCTAD)
United Nations Educational, Scientific, and Cultural Organization (UNESCO)
United Nations Industrial Development Organization (UNIDO)
United Nations Interim Force in Lebanon (UNIFIL)
United Nations Truce Supervision Organization (UNTSO)
Universal Postal Union (UPU)
Western European Union (WEU) (associate partner)
World Customs Organization (WCO)
World Federation of Trade Unions (WFTU)
World Health Organization (WHO)
World Intellectual Property Organization (WIPO)
World Meteorological Organization (WMO)
World Tourism Organization (UNWTO)
World Trade Organization (WTO)
Zangger Committee (ZC)

Law and order in Slovenia 

Law of Slovenia
 Capital punishment in Slovenia
 Constitution of Slovenia
 Crime in Slovenia
 Human rights in Slovenia
 LGBT rights in Slovenia
 Freedom of religion in Slovenia
 Law enforcement in Slovenia

Military of Slovenia 

Military of Slovenia
 Command
 Commander-in-chief: President of Slovenia
 Ministry of Defence of Slovenia
 Forces
 Army of Slovenia
 Navy of Slovenia
 Air Force of Slovenia
 Special forces of Slovenia
 Military history of Slovenia
 Slovenian military ranks

Local government in Slovenia 

Local government in Slovenia

History of Slovenia 

 Military history of Slovenia

Culture of Slovenia 

Culture of Slovenia
 Architecture of Slovenia
 Cuisine of Slovenia
 Festivals in Slovenia
 Languages of Slovenia
 Media in Slovenia
 National symbols of Slovenia
 Coat of arms of Slovenia
 Flag of Slovenia
 National anthem of Slovenia: Zdravljica
 People of Slovenia
 Prostitution in Slovenia
 Public holidays in Slovenia
 Records of Slovenia
 Religion in Slovenia
 Buddhism in Slovenia
 Christianity in Slovenia
 Roman Catholicism in Slovenia
 Hinduism in Slovenia
 Islam in Slovenia
 Judaism in Slovenia
 Sikhism in Slovenia
 World Heritage Sites in Slovenia

Art in Slovenia 
 Art of Slovenia
 Cinema of Slovenia
 Literature of Slovenia
 Music of Slovenia
 Radio in Slovenia
 Television in Slovenia
 Theatre in Slovenia

Sports in Slovenia 

Sports in Slovenia
 Football in Slovenia
 Slovenia at the Olympics
 Slovenian Sportsman of the year

Economy and infrastructure of Slovenia 

Economy of Slovenia
 Economic rank, by nominal GDP (2007): 67th (sixty-seventh)
 Agriculture in Slovenia
 Banking in Slovenia
 National Bank of Slovenia
 Communications in Slovenia
 Internet in Slovenia
 Companies of Slovenia
Currency of Slovenia: Euro (see also: Euro topics)
ISO 4217: EUR
 Energy in Slovenia
 Energy policy of Slovenia
 Oil industry in Slovenia
 Health care in Slovenia
 Mining in Slovenia
 Slovenia Stock Exchange
 Tourism in Slovenia
 Transport in Slovenia
 Airports in Slovenia
 Rail transport in Slovenia
 Roads in Slovenia
 Motorways in Slovenia
 Water supply and sanitation in Slovenia

Education in Slovenia 

Education in Slovenia
 Universities in Slovenia
 The National Education Institute of the Republic of Slovenia

See also 

Slovenia
Index of Slovenia-related articles
List of international rankings
List of Slovenia-related topics
Member state of the European Union
Member state of the North Atlantic Treaty Organization
Member state of the United Nations
Outline of Europe
Outline of geography

References

External links 

 The Republic of Slovenia. Government links.
 Slovenia: a geographical overview. Published by the Association of the Geographical Societies of Slovenia.
 Statistical Office of the Republic of Slovenia
 The Slovenian Tourist portal. Published by the Slovenian Tourist Board.
 Slovenia - Landmarks. A site featuring virtual reality panoramas of various spots in the country.

Slovenia
Outline